Tony Connolly (born 5 April 1941 in Blackrock, County Cork, Ireland) is an Irish former sportsperson. He played hurling with his local clubs Blackrock and St Finbarr's and was a member at senior level of the Cork county team from 1960, interrupted by serious hand injury, returned 1966 until 1968, when six months suspension ended his career.

Playing career

Club
Connolly began his club hurling career with the Blackrock club. In 1961 he won his first county senior championship title as 'the Rockies' defeated north Cork divisional side Avondhu by 4-10 to 3-7.

After a dispute with the Blackrock club Connolly left and joined the St Finbarr's club on the southside of Cork city. Here he had even more success, winning a second county title in 1965 following 'the Barr's' 6-8 to 2-5 defeat of UCC. The club later represented Cork in the provincial club series and even reached the final. A 3-12 to 2-3 defeat of Waterford's Mount Sion gave Connolly a Munster club winners' medal.

After St Finbarr's lost the 1967 county final to Glen Rovers, the club recovered to reach the championship decider again the following year. A remarkable 5-9 to 1-9 defeat of divisional side Imokilly gave Connolly a third county championship title.

Inter-county
Connolly made his return with the Cork senior hurling team in a Munster quarter-final against Clare in 1966.  It was the beginning of a return to the big time for 'the Rebels' after a decade in the doldrums. That year Cork qualified for a Munster showdown with Waterford. An entertaining hour of hurling followed, however, victory went to Cork by 4-9 to 2-9 for the first time in ten years. It was Connolly's first senior Munster winners' medal. This victory allowed Cork to advance directly to the All-Ireland final where arch-rivals Kilkenny provided the opposition. It was the first meeting of these two great sides since 1947 and 'the Cats' were installed as the firm favourites. In spite of this a hat-trick of goals by Colm Sheehan gave Cork a merited 3-9 to 1-10 victory over an Eddie Keher-inspired Kilkenny. It was Connolly's first All-Ireland winners' medal.

Cork failed to retain their provincial and All-Ireland titles in 1967 while Tipperary trounced Cork by nine points in the Munster final a year later, a game missed through injury by Connolly.  Connolly left the Cork team following this defeat.

References

1941 births
Living people
Blackrock National Hurling Club hurlers
St Finbarr's hurlers
Cork inter-county hurlers
All-Ireland Senior Hurling Championship winners